This is a list of electoral results for the Electoral district of Northcote in Victorian state elections.

Members for Northcote

Election results

Elections in the 2020s

2022

Elections in the 2010s

2018

2017 by-election

2014

2010

Elections in the 2000s

2006

2002

Elections in the 1990s

1999

1998 by-election

1996

1992

Elections in the 1980s

1988

1985

1982

Elections in the 1970s

1979

1976

1973

1970

Elections in the 1960s

1967

1964

1961

 The two candidate preferred vote was not counted between the Labor and DLP candidates for Northcote.

Elections in the 1950s

1958

1957

 Preferences were not distributed.

1955

1952

1950

Elections in the 1940s

Elections in the 1930s

Elections in the 1920s

References

 

Victoria (Australia) state electoral results by district